Newton Tracey is a small village in the North Devon district of Devon, England, on the B3232 road about  south of Barnstaple. The village is in the civil parish of Horwood, Lovacott and Newton Tracey.

The Grade II* listed church of St Thomas à Becket dates from the 13th century. Its nave was remodelled in the 15th century when the tower was added, and the whole was restored in 1867–8.

References 

North Devon
Villages in Devon